Zorlu Center is a multiple-use complex in the Beşiktaş district of Istanbul, Turkey containing an upscale shopping mall, a five-star Raffles hotel and a Cinemaximum megaplex, as well as residences and offices. It is home to Zorlu PSM, the largest performing arts center in the country, as well as the country's first Apple Store.

Built in 2013 to a design by Emre Arolat Architects and Tabanlıoğlu Architects, the center is situated at the junction of the European connection of the Bosphorus Bridge with Barbaros Boulevard, which proceeds to the north as Büyükdere Avenue in Levent and Maslak.

History
At a public auction in 2007, Zorlu Real Estate, a subsidiary of Zorlu Holding, submitted the highest bid (US$800 million) to purchase the land at the junction of  - the European connection of the Bosphorus Bridge, and Büyükdere Avenue. It subsequently announced the "Zorlu Center Architecture and Urban Design Competition" for concept and design proposals. Over 100 firms applied and 13 were selected to take part in the competition with Tabanlıoğlu Architects and Emre Arolat Architects submitting the winning proposal. A Vision in Architecture: Projects for the Istanbul Zorlu Center (2012) by Süha Özkan documents the design competition. Construction of the project was completed in 2013.

Architecture
The center is a four-tower, five-function structure group, including a public square, residential development, hotel, and office space. The design is stated to be "shaped by a modern understanding of architecture", based on the concept of a historical town square, incorporating "bold geometric lines that frame the sky, as well as large expanses of greenery".

Retail
The shopping center contains over 200 shops, 40 cafés and restaurants. It contains stores of luxury brands such as Beymen, Atelier Rebul, Vakko, COS, Moncler, Bulgari, Pomellato, Louis Vuitton, Fendi, Lanvin, Dior, Miu Miu, Burberry, Tory Burch, Michael Kors and Valentino, as well as Turkey's first Apple Store. Beymen's largest store in the center covers some  filled with "every fashionable item imaginable, from ready-to-wear to couture, cosmetics to home accessories, menswear to womenswear, accessories to books, and designers that are not available anywhere else in the city". Atelier Rebul is owned by Rebul, Istanbul's oldest drug store, and is a boutique selling specially made beauty products, including lavender, green tea, or jasmine.

Zorlu Center also contains numerous international restaurants and cafés, including Eataly, Jamie’s Italian, and Tom’s Kitchen. It also houses the restaurant Morini, owned by the AltaMarea Group, serving Italian and Mediterranean food under chef Michael White.

Hotel 

The Raffles Istanbul Hotel and Spa opened in September 2014. It is home to 3 restaurants, 49 suites and 136 guest rooms.

Zorlu Performing Arts Center 

Zorlu PSM, the largest performing arts center in the city, was developed by Nederlander Worldwide Entertainment. It features a 770-seat theater as well as a 2,300-seat concert hall.

Gallery

References

External links

 
 
 
 

2013 establishments in Turkey
Commercial buildings completed in 2013
Entertainment venues in Istanbul
Hotels in Istanbul
Music venues in Istanbul
Residential skyscrapers in Istanbul
Shopping malls in Istanbul
Theatres in Istanbul
Beşiktaş
Istanbul Central Business District
21st-century architecture in Turkey